Vulcão da Urzelina  is a volcano near the civil parish of Urzelina, Velas municipality, São Jorge Island, Azores.

It erupted in May and June 1808, causing destruction and over 30 deaths in Urzelina and producing a basalt field of volcanic rock extending to the Ponta da Urzelina. The eruption was the last sub-aerial event observed in the Azores; most recent eruptions have occurred along submarine vents, with the Capelinhos eruption (1957–58) starting as a submarine eruption (that eventually grew into a sub-aerial event) and the 1998–2001 Serreta eruption being exclusively submarine (never breaking the surface).

Bocas de Fogo or Bocas de Fogo da Urzelina is a colloquial name of the volcano used only locally, but it is neither used in science nor in administrative maps.

Eruption

In the late morning of May 1, 1808, after a few days of intense seismic activity (that produced approximately eight tremors per hour), a fissural eruption occurred in the foothills of Manadas. Its eruption, which also affected other districts, was followed by gaseous emanations and lava flows that caused several deaths and destruction in the parish of Urzelina.

The events of the eruptions were reconstructed from various descriptions after the event, the most significant coming from Father João Ignácio da Silveira, parish priest of Santo Amaro. From these accounts, he wrote of a "great cloud of fire" that grew above the parish of Urzelina which was followed by abundant ash showers:

A similar account was described by João Soares de Albergaria de Sousa, in the quasi-political document Corografia Açórica:

The volcanic activity continued until May 4, from several points above Urzelina, migrating to as far as  towards the direction of Entre Ribeiras. The parish of Santo Amaro was also affected on May 11, when two craters in the area of Areias began expelling lava which forced the evacuation of the population.

Pyroclastic flows

Fifteen days after the initial eruption, explosive activity occurred again above Urzelina. This new episode was accompanied by the production of lava that destroyed a great part of the parish, fostering gas clouds and nuée ardente that caused the death of thirty people, as described by João Teixeira Soares:

In the Revue Scientifique de la France a de l’Etranger, Ferdinand André Fouqué writing on the eruptions of 1580 and 1808 verified, in the two craters that he investigated, the implications of the pyroclastic flows:

A similar description was compiled by João Teixeira Soares, writing in the O Jorgense (numbers 21, 22 of August 15 and September 1, 1872) He was a little more specific, noting that in the timeline of the events, that around June 5, ten days after the first emissions covered the island, fumes flowed to the east and west, causing a large surge in temperatures and devastating the vegetation.

Poisonous gases
Fouque continued:

These suffocating gases, which were probably carboxylic acid, were harmful to the population; the thick water-vapor, which condensed in a reddish color, rapidly spread unnoticed through the local vegetation (a mix chloric and sulfuric acids) which were expelled as aqueous vapors.

Physically, the events was centered on seven craters, in the area known as Lagoinhas, and its effects were most prominent around the area near the Church of São Mateus. The temple itself was survived by the bell-tower, which became an ex-libris for the island of São Jorge. Even following the eruption, gas emissions continued to be observed from the craters and lava flows.

Reactions
Abandoned by the civil judge, the remaining councilmen, appointed by Royal charter (December 12, 1806), Captain Amaro Teixeira de Sousa, Sargent-major José Soares de Sousa, Capitan João Ignacio da Silveira, and municipal attorney Jorge José Covilhão closed themselves off in the municipal chambers in order to concentrate on the crisis, detailing all their actions in a ledger.

Captain-General D. Miguel António de Melo, realizing the need of the islanders, ordered, in a May 18 decree, the free distribution of five moios of corn, recommending that they should plead for "divine mercy" while offering his assistance on the island, if his presence would assist their cause. In a letter dated July 23, the municipal chamber accepted the General's offer of cereal and foodstuffs, but the writer, José Félix Rodrigues Mendes, added:

The intent of the request was to free some serfs to assist in the reconstruction, but the Civil Governor and Captain-General, responding in an angry letter, dated October 21, were insulted by the letter's signatories, demanding that those who had signed the document should have their functions suspended (resulting in José Félix Rodrigues Mendes's suspension from the municipal chamber). Out of personal spite, the Captain-General continued that he: "...had, for similar absurdities, run to ground António Sebastião Espínola for these type of ordinary strategies...you deserve that I order your apprehension and have you arrested on my order...!!!"

Afterwards

Over thirty people were killed as a direct consequence of the eruption, while several of the islands of the Azores were affected by ash showers (Pico, Terceira and São Miguel) from June 5 to June 10, or felt continuous earthquakes during the event (as was the case on Faial and Pico).

The several earthquakes that occurred during the events motivated officials in Horta to send personal assistance to the island; in this case a contingent of residents traveled to Velas in order to offer support and their hospitality to many of the local people affected by the crisis.

The church's parish priest, José António de Barcellos, wrote later (per the writings of João Teixeira Soares), that the event was both an act of God and divine providence, since for years he had requested assistance for the construction of a new parish, and received evasive responses. It was during the governance of Captain-General Francisco de Borja Garção Stockler, after the 1808 eruption, that he was able to raise the costs and through sacrifices, construct the new parish.

The effects of the eruption even persisted to 1810; in that year, three men were asphyxiated when they attempted to clean a salt-water pool along the Urzelina coast (which they had discovered to have been polluted with ash). During excavations made in June 1877, in addition to many ruins, the house once owned by Jorge Soares de Avelar was discovered.

References

Sources
 
 
 
 
 
 

Volcanoes of Portugal
19th-century volcanic events
Fissure vents
São Jorge Island
Geology of the Azores